Kenneth Swain (born 28 January 1952) is an English former footballer who played in numerous positions, including striker, midfielder and full back.

Playing career
Swain began his professional career with Londoners Chelsea, signing from Wycombe Wanderers in the summer of 1973. As he had been a non-contract player with Wycombe, having joined them from college football, his signing-on fee was just £500. He made his League debut for Chelsea in 1974. His most successful season with the club came in 1976–77, when his strike partnership with Steve Finnieston helped Eddie McCreadie's young side win promotion back to the First Division. He remained with Chelsea until 1979, when they were relegated, and then signed for Aston Villa for £100,000.

With Villa, Swain was switched to full-back and was a part of the team which won the league championship and European Cup in consecutive seasons. He left Villa in 1982 and had spells with Nottingham Forest, Portsmouth and finally Crewe Alexandra. He achieved success later in his career, adding to the league title and European Cup winner's medals at Aston Villa with a Second Division runners-up medal at Portsmouth in 1987, and achieving promotion in third place with Crewe from the Fourth Division in 1989.

Managerial career
Following his retirement, he moved into management, with stints at Grimsby Town and Wigan Athletic. He also managed the England under-16s for a decade between 2004–2014 and was as an assistant coach for the England national under-17 football team between 2012–13.

Personal life
Between 2002 and 2004, Swain was Director of Football at Thomas Telford School.

Managerial statistics

Honours
Aston Villa
 Football League First Division: 1980–81
 FA Charity Shield: 1981 (shared) 
 European Cup: 1981–82

Individual
 PFA Team of the Year: 1980–81 First Division, 1981–82 First Division

References 

● Playfair football annuals 1974–75 to 1992–93

External links

Living people
1952 births
Sportspeople from Birkenhead
English footballers
Association football defenders
English Football League players
Wycombe Wanderers F.C. players
Chelsea F.C. players
Aston Villa F.C. players
Nottingham Forest F.C. players
Portsmouth F.C. players
West Bromwich Albion F.C. players
Crewe Alexandra F.C. players
English football managers
Wigan Athletic F.C. managers
Grimsby Town F.C. managers
Grimsby Town F.C. non-playing staff